Muhammed Ali Kurt (born 18 April 1996) is a Turkish badminton player who educated at the Erzincan University. He competed at the 2018 Mediterranean Games.

Achievements

European Junior Championships 
Boys' singles

BWF International Challenge/Series 
Men's singles

Men's doubles

Mixed doubles

  BWF International Challenge tournament
  BWF International Series tournament
  BWF Future Series tournament

References

External links 
 
 

1996 births
Living people
Turkish male badminton players
Badminton players at the 2014 Summer Youth Olympics
Competitors at the 2018 Mediterranean Games
Mediterranean Games competitors for Turkey
21st-century Turkish people